MoneyWeek is a British weekly investment magazine that covers financial and economic news and provides commentary and analysis across the UK and global markets. MoneyWeek is edited in London.

It is owned by MoneyWeek Limited, which is now a subsidiary of Future plc, then-parent company Dennis Publishing owned it once before, prior to 2002.

From July to December 2015, the magazine had an Audit Bureau of Circulations (ABC) certified circulation of 45,540 (99.0% of which was in the UK and Ireland).

History
MoneyWeek, founded by Jolyon Connell, was launched in November 2000 and originally published in association with Dennis Publishing. It was designed as a financial version of The Week magazine, which was founded by Jolyon Connell five years previously.

MoneyWeek was sold by Dennis Publishing to Financial News Ltd. in August 2002. In late 2003, it was bought by U.S. financial publisher, Agora Inc. headed by Bill Bonner, who contributed a weekly column in the magazine.

A South African edition of MoneyWeek was launched in June 2007, initially on a subscription basis, with newsstand availability beginning in 2008. In September 2008, MoneyWeek France, a French language edition of MoneyWeek, published in Paris, was launched. It ceased publishing in October 2011.

MoneyWeek supported Leave in the UK's 2016 EU Referendum.

In 2017, MoneyWeek was re-acquired by Dennis Publishing. The brand joined Dennis’ Current Affairs division, which included The Week.

Content 
MoneyWeek is edited by John Stepek. Merryn Somerset Webb is the magazine's editor in chief.

MoneyWeek provides a digest of the week's financial and investment news, and also covers associated economic and political stories.

In addition to the news digest, it features market commentary and analysis, share tips, interviews, travel and lifestyle pieces.

Regular columnists include Bill Bonner, Matthew Lynn, Charlie Morris, Dominic Frisby, Tim Price, and Jim Mellon.

Ban in China
In April 2015, MoneyWeek was effectively banned in China after having its publishing permit revoked for reporting on corruption.

See also
 International Living

References

External links
 MoneyWeek official website

2000 establishments in the United Kingdom
Business magazines published in the United Kingdom
Magazines established in 2000
Magazines published in London
News magazines published in the United Kingdom
Weekly magazines published in the United Kingdom